Roy Williams was a BBC Radio continuity announcer  active in the 1940s and 1950s.

He appeared as a castaway on the BBC Radio programme Desert Island Discs on 8 September 1945.

References 

 'The Announcers' Page with picture of Williams at work

Year of birth missing
Place of birth missing
Year of death missing
Place of death missing
BBC radio presenters